Amita Malik  (1921 – 20 February 2009) was an Indian media critic. She was described by Time magazine as India's "most prominent film and television critic", dubbed the "first lady of Indian media" and "India's best known cinema commentator ". She began her career at All India Radio, Lucknow in 1944 and later worked as a columnist for many Indian newspapers including The Statesman, The Times of India, the Indian Express and Pioneer. She died of leukemia at the age of 87 in Kailas Hospital on 20 February 2009.

Childhood
Amita Malik was born into a Bengali family in Guwahati, Assam. When she was 21 days old, a car she was travelling in collided with another car in which Mahatma Gandhi was sitting.

The very first film she saw in her life was The Gold Rush by Charlie Chaplin screened by the nuns of Loreto Convent Shillong.

Career
She joined All India Radio at Lucknow at a salary of 100 rupees per month. She presented the weekly lunch hour programme of European music on Saturdays. In 1944, she applied for the advertised post of programme assistant and was posted to All India Radio's Delhi station. She was the only Indian film critic to interview many important film celebrities and directors such as Ingmar Bergman and Marlon Brando.

Amita Malik was the first reporter to interview Indira Gandhi when she unexpectedly became Prime Minister of India after Lal Bahadur Shastri's death in Tashkent.

Fellowship to study in Canada
She was awarded the first fellowship of the Canadian Women's Press Club which arranged accommodation for her with their members for 10 months in 1960. Among others, she interviewed Satyajit Ray, Elia Kazan, Akira Kurosawa, Marlon Brando, David Niven, and Alfred Hitchcock.

Campaign against foreigners in saris
In 1960 Malik launched a campaign against foreigners in saris.
"If there is anything uglier than an Indian matron in bulging jeans," she said, "it is a white woman. Tall, angular and with straw-colored hair, wearing a Dacca sari. Foreign wives fondly imagine that they look beautiful in saris, when they would look miles better in gingham."

Removal of restrictions on foreign press during Emergency
Amita Malik was responsible for getting the censorship curbs on foreign media during the Indian Emergency lifted.
"During emergency, Malik met Gandhi at her office in South Block. What do you think of the present state of the media in India," the Prime Minister asked.

'Do you want me to be frank or do you want me to be polite? "Of course, I want you to be frank," the Prime Minister told Malik.'`I do not know what came over me but I immediately launched into a graphic description of the state of terror which was then prevailing in the media..."

'I don't want to sound like a kingmaker, but it is a fact that the very next day the curbs on the foreign press were lifted,"Malik claims."

Campaigns against misuse of media
In 1989 she launched a campaign against the misuse of India's state owned media which had been converted into the private organ of the Indian National Congress party to promote Rajiv Gandhi.

Feud with Khushwant Singh
Khushwant Singh said that Malik had once written he was the worst dressed man she had ever known. He confessed it was the only time he genuinely agreed with her.

Syndicated column (Sight and Sound)
Amita's syndicated column "Sight and Sound" has been published in virtually every leading Indian newspaper at various times. Her column was read by generations of television news readers for Amita's biting sartorial observations on them. At the same time she strongly defended AIR and Doordarshan's underpaid staff who worked under political and bureaucratic pressure.

Memorable quotes from Sight and Sound
"One can certainly give credit to Doordarshan for one thing: It keeps whatever good programmes it has as secret as possible."
"Much as I appreciate Barkha Dutt's energy and enthusiasm, sometimes I get disturbed by her popping up all too frequently here, there and everywhere."
"The programme called Cook Na Kaho was hosted by Upen Patel and what Patel was doing revolted me. Like most Indians I believe in jootha, that is, not polluting food personally with fingers or spoon when it is meant for all. Not for any religious sentiments but because it is unhygienic and can spread infection. What Patel was doing was putting a fork into the ice-cream, licking it and putting it back into the ice-cream. Sorry Patel, but I would not eat your food after that."

Books
 Amita, no holds barred: An autobiography Hardcover – January 1, 1999

Awards
 Kamal Kumari National Award
 B.D.Goenka Award in Journalism 1992
 Hony. Fellowship of International Police Association

References

External links

The inimitable, dear Mrs M
Amita Malik, RIP

1921 births
2009 deaths
Indian film critics
Brahmos
Women television critics
Indian women television journalists
Indian television journalists
Deaths from leukemia
All India Radio people
Date of birth missing
Women film critics
20th-century Indian journalists
20th-century Indian women writers
All India Radio women
Indian women radio presenters
Indian radio presenters
Indian women critics
Bengali writers
People associated with Shillong